Črešnjice nad Pijavškim is a small settlement in the hills above Gornje Pijavško on the right bank of the Sava River in the Municipality of Krško in eastern Slovenia. The area is part of the traditional region of Lower Carniola. It is now included with the rest of the municipality in the Lower Sava Statistical Region.

Name
The name of the settlement was changed from Črešnjice to Črešnjice nad Pijavškim in 1953. In the past the German name was Kerschdorf.

References

External links
Črešnjice nad Pijavškim on Geopedia

Populated places in the Municipality of Krško